Ivan Beltrami (born 27 June 1969) is an Italian former cyclist. He competed at the 1988 Summer Olympics and the 1992 Summer Olympics.

References

External links
 

1969 births
Living people
Italian male cyclists
Olympic cyclists of Italy
Cyclists at the 1988 Summer Olympics
Cyclists at the 1992 Summer Olympics
People from Riva del Garda
Sportspeople from Trentino
Cyclists from Trentino-Alto Adige/Südtirol
20th-century Italian people